The 2019–20 Troy Trojans women's basketball team represents Troy University during the 2019–20 NCAA Division I women's basketball season. The Trojans, led by seventh year head coach Chanda Rigby, play their home games at Trojan Arena and were members of the Sun Belt Conference. They finished the season 25–4, 16–2 in Sun Belt play to finish regular season champions. They received a first and second round bye in the Sun Belt tournament after being seeded 1st. Before their first game, the tournament was canceled due to the COVID-19 pandemic.

Preseason

Sun Belt coaches poll
On October 30, 2019, the Sun Belt released their preseason coaches poll with the Trojans predicted to finish in second place in the conference.

Sun Belt Preseason All-Conference team

2nd team

Amber Rivers – SR, Forward

3rd team

Japonica James – SR, Forward

Roster

Schedule

|-
!colspan=9 style=| Non-conference regular season

|-
!colspan=9 style=| Sun Belt regular season

|-
!colspan=9 style=| Sun Belt Women's Tournament

Rankings
2018–19 NCAA Division I women's basketball rankings

See also
 2018–19 Troy Trojans men's basketball team

References

Troy Trojans women's basketball seasons
Troy
Troy